"Catch Me If You Can" is a song recorded in two languages (Japanese and Korean) by South Korean girl group Girls' Generation. The Korean version was released by SM Entertainment and KT Music on April 10, 2015, while the Japanese version was released on April 22 by EMI and Universal Music Japan. The song was composed by Erik Lidbom and Jin Choi, with the Korean lyrics written by Mafly and Choi A-reum, and the Japanese lyrics written by Junji Ishiwatari and Jeff Miyahara. Musically, it was described by critics as an EDM track. The song marked the first release of Girls' Generation as an eight-member group following the dismissal of member Jessica Jung in September 2014.

The single received generally favorable reviews from music critics, who not only praised its musical styles, but also compared the song to works by American musicians such as Zedd and Skrillex. Commercially, the single peaked at number 19 on the South Korean Gaon Digital Chart and number 8 on the Japanese Oricon Singles Chart. Two music videos were created for the single, one for the Korean version and one for the Japanese version, which were released simultaneously on April 10, 2015. The music videos were hailed for their "mind-blowing" choreography, as described by Billboard magazine.

Background
South Korean girl group Girls' Generation had achieved success on the Asian music scene with hit singles such as "Gee" and "I Got a Boy" since their 2007 debut as a nine-piece girl group, consisting of members Taeyeon, Jessica, Sunny, Tiffany, Hyoyeon, Yuri, Sooyoung, Yoona and Seohyun. In September 2014, Jessica announced that she had been dismissed as a member of Girls' Generation by their parent company SM Entertainment, due to her schedule conflict between the group's mutual music activities and her own fashion business Blanc & Eclare; the release of "Catch Me If You Can" marked Girls' Generation's first release as an eight-member group.

On February 18, 2015, it was announced that Girls' Generation was preparing for their comeback in Japan by releasing their ninth Japanese single named "Catch Me If You Can", which was scheduled to be released in Japan on April 22, 2015. On March 23, further information regarding the single was announced: the Japanese version of "Catch Me If You Can" would be distributed under three formats: CD single, digital download, and 12-inch single. The Korean version was released digitally worldwide by SM Entertainment on April 10, 2015. Due to its popularity on YouTube, the song also received airplay on SiriusXM Hits 1 radio during the week of April 20, 2015. Both versions of the single contain a B-side track titled "Girls".

Composition and reception

The music for "Catch Me If You Can" was composed by Erik Lidbom and Jin Choi. The Korean lyrics were written by Mafly and Choe A-Leum, while the Japanese lyrics were written by Junji Ishiwatari and Jeff Miyahara. Musically, the song was described as an electronic dance music (EDM) track. Jeff Benjamin, writing for Fuse, noted it as a departure from the group's signature bubblegum pop styles and named it "high-turbo" EDM. The song is instrumented by "surging" synthesizers, tribal house beats, and bass drops. Upon its release, "Catch Me If You Can" received generally positive reviews from music critics. Benjamin further compared the track's breakdowns to the musical styles of Russian–German DJ Zedd and wrote that the song "rise[s] above any mediocre label". He also wrote an article for Billboard where he compared its musical styles to those of Zedd and American DJ Skrillex, labelling it a "smart move".

Chart performance

The Korean version of "Catch Me If You Can" peaked at number 19 on the Gaon Digital Chart and has sold 135,068 digital downloads. It also peaked at number 2 on the US World Digital Songs chart by Billboard magazine, becoming the group's highest-charting single on the chart. The Japanese version debuted at number 8 on the Japanese Oricon Singles Chart, selling 20,835 physical copies in its first week of release. It becoming the 31st highest-selling CD single of April in Japan, selling 23,167 physical units. It has since sold 28,208 copies in Japan as of January 2017. It additionally charted at number 9 on the Japan Hot 100 by Billboard Japan. In Taiwan, the single charted atop the G-Music J-pop chart in the first week of May 2015.

Music videos and promotion 
On April 10, 2015, SM Entertainment released the Korean music video on YouTube and other online web-sharing websites, while the Japanese music video was disclosed on the group's Japanese official website. The audio was revealed simultaneously on several South Korean online distributors.

Prior to the release, the members of Girls' Generation had promoted the new song on their social network profiles, including Instagram and Sina Weibo. SM Entertainment also started a selfie contest with the hashtag "#catchGG" on Twitter, accompanying the group's comeback. Following the release of the song, the group did not do any official promotion in South Korea. However, Girls' Generation later performed the song on South Korean music program Show! Music Core, in conjunction with the release of the group's subsequent single "Party", in July 2015. They also performed the song on NTV's Live Monster concert in Japan during the same month.

The music video for "Catch Me If You Can" was directed by Toshiyuki Suzuki and features the members dancing in white tank tops and orange uniforms at a construction zone. Jeff Benjamin from American music magazine Billboard described the choreography as "powerful and sexy" and "mind-blowing". He further commented that the members sure "can dance their asses off" and compared the video to Ciara's 2009 music video for "Work" for the same construction zone background and the white tank top look. Similarly, Filipino channel Myx praised the music video's visual, commenting that the group were "keeping it hot with their steamy moves and outfits". In June 2015, an earlier version of the music video featuring ex-member Jessica was unofficially released onto the Internet. It was presumably filmed before she was dismissed from the group in September 2014.

Track listings and formats

Chart

Korean version

Japanese version

Release history

Credits 
Credits adapted from single's liner notes.

Studio 
 SM Blue Ocean Studio – recording, digital editing 
 Bunkamura Studio – recording 
 Silent Sound Studio – mixing 
 Sterling Sound – mastering

Personnel 

 SM Entertainment – executive producer
 Lee Soo-man – producer
 Girls' Generation – vocals, background vocals
 Choi A-reum – Korean lyrics 
 Mafly – Korean lyrics 
 Lee Seum-ran – Korean lyrics 
 Junji Ishiwatari – Japanese lyrics 
 Jeff Miyahara – Japanese lyrics , vocal directing , recording 
 Miwa – Japanese lyrics 
 Jin Choi – composition, arrangement 
 Erik Lidbom – composition, arrangement 
 Roel De Meulemeester – composition, arrangement 
 Stefanie De Meulemeester – composition 
 Guy Balbaert – composition 
 Patrick Hamilton – arrangement 
 Keita Joko – chief engineer 
 Kim Cheol-sun – recording, digital editing 
 Jon Rezin – mixing 
 Miles Walker – mixing 
 Tom Coyne – mastering

References

External links

2015 singles
2015 songs
Girls' Generation songs
Korean-language songs
Japanese-language songs
Songs written by Erik Lidbom
Electronic dance music songs
SM Entertainment singles
Universal Music Japan singles